Pānzhuāng (潘庄镇) could refer to the following locations in China: 

 Panzhuang, Lulong County, town in northeastern Hebei
 Panzhuang, Linqing, town in Linqing, Shandong
 Panzhuang, Ninghe County, town in Ninghe County, Tianjin